Carl Douglas Olds (11 May 1912 – 11 November 1979) was a New Zealand-born  American mathematician specializing in number theory.

Biography
Carl Olds was born in 1912 in Wanganui, New Zealand. He was an undergraduate student at Stanford University, and continued at Stanford as a graduate student, defending his Ph.D. thesis On the Number of Representations of the Square of an Integer as the Sum of an Odd Number of Squares at Stanford University in 1943 under the supervision of James V. Uspensky.

From 1935 to 1940 and in the summer of 1942, he was an acting instructor at Stanford University and from 1940 to 1945, an assistant professor at Purdue University. From 1945 until his retirement, Olds was based at California State University, San Jose, where he advanced through the ranks to full professor. He died on 11 November 1979 in Santa Clara, California.

Recognition
Olds was awarded the 1973 Chauvenet Prize for his paper "The Simple Continued Fraction Expansion of e", published in the American Mathematical Monthly in 1970.

Works

Books

Articles
 Olds, Carl D. The Simple Continued Fraction Expansion of e , The American Mathematical Monthly, Vol. 77, No. 9 (Nov., 1970), pp. 968–974. (URL, PDF)
 Olds, Carl D. The Best Polynomial Approximation of Functions, The American Mathematical Monthly, Vol. 57, No. 9 (Nov., 1950), pp. 617–621. (URL)
 Olds, Carl D. Note on an asymmetric diophantine approximation, Bull. Amer. Math. Soc. 52 (1946), pp. 261–263. (URL)
 Olds, Carl D. On the representations, N3(n2), Bull. Amer. Math. Soc. Volume 47, Number 6 (1941), pp. 499–503. (URL)

References

20th-century American mathematicians
Purdue University faculty
Stanford University alumni
Number theorists
People from Whanganui
1912 births
1979 deaths
New Zealand emigrants to the United States
San Jose State University faculty